Kechnec is a village in eastern Slovakia.

Geography
The village lies at an altitude of 180 metres and covers an area of 10.211 km². The municipality is part of the administrative units Košice-okolie District and Košice Region. It has a population of about 1080 people.

History
Historically, the village was first mentioned in 1220 as a settlement called Felnemet. Being on the Hungarian Queen’s land at the lower stream of the River Hornád, the territory of Kechnec was settled by German immigrants at the turn of the 12th and 13th centuries. We know that from the Varadin’s Register of 1220. In 1295 the Queen Agnes gave the town of Kechnec, together with another 7 small towns to Menne, a surrogate breastfeeder of King Ladislaus IV of Hungary. An old document dated to 1338 says that in this town there was a mill, located near the present town of Seňa, which was preserved to the modern times. This documents active work and life of local farmers. The King Sigmund, another major player in the history of the town, gave Kechnec to the Marmoss administrator Peter of Perin. It was a gift for his loyalty and military merits. This fact documents the importance of Kechnec at that time. The donation and merit document is interesting due to its bilingual name – Felnemethy alio domine Kemnech. Although already before the time of arrival of German colonists the town of Kechnec had had its own Slavic name, which the Germans adopted, it also got its official Hungarian name Felnémeti. In 1560 the town was named Kenyhecz Nempty, in 1605 Kenyhecz, in 1808 Kechnec, and the last mentioned name has been preserved until now. According to the conscriptions of local priests and churches, in 1746 people in Kechnec spoke Slovak. A number of major landowners were resident in the town, from among which it is worth to mention the Kenyheczi and Czikovics families. János Czikovics obtained Kechnec from King Leopold I in 1689 in Vienna.

Economy
Nowadays, Kechnec is becoming an industrial centre of this region. Kechnec Industrial Zone is a green field of 332 hectares (820 acres) with a newly constructed public infrastructure. New investors are coming here, that gives new opportunities for work.

Twin towns — sister cities
Kechnec is twinned with:

  Isaszeg, Hungary

Genealogical resources

The records for genealogical research are available at the state archive "Statny Archiv in Kosice, Slovakia"

 Roman Catholic church records (births/marriages/deaths): 1714-1895 (parish A)
 Greek Catholic church records (births/marriages/deaths): 1791-1896 (parish B)
 Reformated church records (births/marriages/deaths): 1794-1901 (parish B)

See also
 List of municipalities and towns in Slovakia

References

External links
http://www.kechnec.sk/
http://www.kipp.sk/index.php
Surnames of living people in Kechnec

Villages and municipalities in Košice-okolie District